Émile Clément Cotton (5 February 1872 – 14 March 1950) was a professor of mathematics at the University of Grenoble. His PhD thesis studied differential geometry in three dimensions, with the introduction of the Cotton tensor.  He held the professorship from 1904 until his 1942 retirement. He was the brother of Aimé Cotton.

References

Differential geometers
French mathematicians
1872 births
1950 deaths